Crazy Like a Fox is an American television series set in San Francisco, California, that aired on CBS from December 30, 1984 to May 3, 1986.

Overview
The series starred Jack Warden as Harry Fox, a free-spirited private detective who lived by his wits, and John Rubinstein as his high-strung attorney son, Harrison, who unwillingly, and frequently, found himself dragged into his father's cases.

The show's opening would always feature Harry and Harrison talking on the phone in their offices like this:

Harrison: Hello?
Harry: Harrison, I need your help.
Harrison: Dad, you keep forgetting. I'm a lawyer. You're the detective!
Harry: Aw, come on son. All I need is a ride. What could possibly happen?

Penny Peyser played Harry Jr.'s wife and Della Reese had a recurring role as a nurse at the local hospital who had an antagonistic (in a very joking and friendly manner) relationship with Harry Sr, often assisting him in his investigations and providing her own information.

Originally airing Sundays at 9 pm (EST), the show was a hit in its first season, ranking 10th with a 19.9 rating, and initially continued to pull solid numbers during its second season, but midway through that season, CBS brought back its Sunday Night Movie, which displaced the show (along with Trapper John, M.D., which followed Crazy Like a Fox up to that point) and resulted in it being bounced around to various time slots, which caused ratings to drop significantly and led to its cancellation at the end of the season. The second season ended up ranking 44th with a 15.0 rating.

Reruns were later shown in syndication and on the CBN Cable Network, and a reunion TV movie titled Still Crazy Like a Fox aired on CBS in 1987 that featured Monty Python's Graham Chapman in one of his last roles.

For his performance, Warden received two nominations for the Primetime Emmy Award for Outstanding Lead Actor in a Comedy Series.

As of 2020, the show now airs on the UK GREAT! tv. In 2023, the show started airing reruns for the first time on American television in over 30 years, being added to the MeTV+ schedule, airing five days a week at 11AM.

Broadcast history

Cast
Jack Warden as Harrison Joshua "Harry" Fox, Sr.
John Rubinstein as Harrison Joshua Fox, Jr.
Penny Peyser as Cindy Fox (JR's wife)
Robby Kiger as Harrison Joshua "Josh" Fox III (JR & Cindy's son)
Lydia Lei as Allison Ling (1984–1985)
Patricia Ayame Thomson as Allison Ling (1985–1986)
Robert Hanley as Lt. Walker
Theodore Wilson as Ernie
Della Reese as Nurse Flood (1985–1986)

Episode list

Season 1 (1984–85)

Season 2 (1985–86)

TV reunion film

See also
So Help Me Todd, a current CBS series with a similar premise

References

External links

1980s American comedy-drama television series
1980s American crime drama television series
1984 American television series debuts
1986 American television series endings
CBS original programming
Television series by Sony Pictures Television
1980s American crime television series
Television shows set in San Francisco